The 2013–14 National League 2 South was the fifth season (27th overall) of the fourth tier (south) of the English domestic rugby union competitions since the professionalised format of the second division was introduced.  The league system was 4 points for a win, 2 points for a draw and additional bonus points being awarded for scoring 4 or more tries and/or losing within 7 points of the victorious team.  In terms of promotion the league champions would go straight up into National League 1 while the runners up would have a one-game playoff against the runners up from National League 2 North (at the home ground of the club with the superior league record) for the final promotion place.  After an absence of several years, the Cornwall Super Cup returned in a new format with the two league matches between the Cornish sides Launceston and Redruth also counting towards the cup.

Hartpury College, as champions, were promoted to the third tier (2014–15 National League 1) for next season. League runners-up, Ampthill, lost the annual play–off against the 2013–14 National League 2 North runners up, Darlington Mowden Park 30 – 28.  London Irish Wild Geese were demoted to National League 3 London & SE, and Bournemouth and Exmouth were both relegated to National League 3 South West.  Finally, the Cornish Super Cup was won by Launceston who defeated Redruth via an aggregate score of 39 - 28.

Participating teams
Eleven of the teams listed below participated in the 2012–13 National League 2 South season. Cambridge were relegated from National League 1; London Irish and Exmouth were promoted from National League 3 South West; Bishop's Stortford were promoted from National League 3 London & SE; Ampthill were promoted from National League 3 Midlands and were then level transferred from National League 2 North (where they would normally have expected to play) due to an imbalance in the number of teams in the two fourth tier leagues.

League table

Results

Round 1

Round 2

Round 3

Round 4

Round 5

Round 6

Round 7

Round 8

Round 9

Round 10

Round 11

Round 12

Round 13

Round 14

Round 15

Round 16

Postponed.  Game to be rescheduled for 22 February 2014.

Round 17

Postponed.  Game to be replayed on 15 March 2014.

Round 18

Round 19

Postponed.  Game to be rescheduled for 22 February 2014.

Round 20

Round 21

Postponed.  Game to be rescheduled for 22 February 2014.

Postponed.  Game to be rescheduled for 22 February 2014.

Postponed.  Game to be rescheduled for 15 March 2014.

Round 22

Postponed.  Game to be rescheduled for 22 February 2014.

Postponed.  Game to be rescheduled for 19 April 2014.

Postponed.  Game to be rescheduled for 15 March 2014.

Round 23

Postponed.  Game rescheduled to 19 April 2014.

Postponed.  Game rescheduled to 22 February 2014.

Postponed.  Game rescheduled to 15 March 2014.

Postponed.  Game rescheduled to 19 April 2014.

Postponed.  Game rescheduled to 19 April 2014.

Postponed.  Game rescheduled to 15 March 2014.

Postponed.  Game rescheduled to 19 April 2014.

Postponed.  Game rescheduled to 15 March 2015.

Rounds 16, 19, 21, 22 & 23 (Rescheduled Games)

Game rescheduled from 18 January 2014

Game rescheduled from 1 February 2014.

Game rescheduled from 21 December 2013

Game rescheduled from 8 February 2015.

Game rescheduled from 15 February 2014

Game rescheduled from 1 February 2014.

Round 24

Round 25

Rounds 17, 21, 22 & 23 (Rescheduled Games)

Game rescheduled from 8 February 2014.

Game rescheduled from 4 January 2014.

Game rescheduled from 15 February 2014.

Game rescheduled from 15 February 2014.

Game rescheduled from 1 February 2014.

Game rescheduled from 15 February 2014.

Round 26

Round 27

Round 28

Round 29

Rounds 22 & 23 (Rescheduled Games)

Game rescheduled from 8 February 2014.

Game rescheduled from 15 February 2014.

Game rescheduled from 15 February 2014.

Game rescheduled from 15 February 2014.

Game rescheduled from 15 February 2014.

Round 30

Promotion play–off
Each season, the runners–up in the National League 2 South and National League 2 North participate in a play–off for promotion into National Division 1. Darlington Mowden Park were runners-up in the 2013–14 National League 2 North and as they had a better record than the South runners-up, Ampthill, they hosted the play–off match.  The game was played on 3 May 2014 at The Northern Echo Arena and finished 25 – 25 after normal time, so went to two 10-minute periods of extra time. The game was won with a try scored by DMP in the 3rd minute of added on time. As a result, they will play in National League 1 in the 2014–15 season for the first time.

Total season attendances

Individual statistics 

 Note that points scorers includes tries as well as conversions, penalties and drop goals.

Top points scorers

Top try scorers

Season records

Team
Largest home win — 68 pts
78 - 10 Ampthill at home to Dings Crusaders on 16 November 2013
Largest away win — 41 pts
63 – 22 Cambridge away to Bishop's Stortford on 5 October 2013
Most points scored — 78 pts
78 - 10 Ampthill at home to Dings Crusaders on 16 November 2013
Most tries in a match — 12
Ampthill at home to Dings Crusaders on 16 November 2013
Most conversions in a match — 9 (x2)
Cambridge away to Bishop's Stortford on 5 October 2013
Ampthill at home to Dings Crusaders on 16 November 2013
Most penalties in a match — 7 
Launceston at home to Hartpury College on 28 September 2013
Most drop goals in a match — 1
N/A - multiple teams

Player
Most points in a match — 31
 Elliot Clements-Hill for Ampthill away to Bournemouth on 19 April 2014
Most tries in a match — 4 (x4)
 Sam Hardcastle for Bournemouth at home to London Irish Wild Geese on 14 September 2013
 Tristan Corpe for Chinnor at home to Dings Crusaders on 14 September 2013
 Dean Adamson for Ampthill at home to Dings Crusaders on 16 November 2013
 Jim Wigglesworth for Cambridge at home to Exmouth on 30 November 2013
Most conversions in a match — 9
 Jim Wigglesworth for Cambridge away to Bishop's Stortford on 5 October 2013
Most penalties in a match — 6 
 Jake Murphy for Launceston at home to Hartpury College on 28 September 2013
Most drop goals in a match — 1
N/A - multiple players

Attendances
Highest — 1,905   
Shelford at home to Cambridge on 12 April 2014
Lowest — 80   
Clifton at home to Southend Saxons on 8 February 2014
Highest Average Attendance — 720
Redruth
Lowest Average Attendance — 179
Exmouth

See also
 English rugby union system
 Rugby union in England

References

External links
 NCA Rugby

2013–14
2013–14 in English rugby union leagues